Valea Sării is a commune located in Vrancea County, Romania. It is composed of five villages: Colacu, Mătăcina, Poduri, Prisaca and Valea Sării.

References

Communes in Vrancea County
Localities in Western Moldavia